Roberto Volpi (born 15 August 1952) was an Italian predominantly steeplechase runner who competed at the 1980 Summer Olympics,

National titles
He won four times the national championships at senior level.

Italian Athletics Championships
3000 m st: 1976, 1977, 1978, 1980

References

External links
 

1952 births
Athletes (track and field) at the 1980 Summer Olympics
Italian male steeplechase runners
Italian male long-distance runners
Olympic athletes of Italy
Living people